Garuga pierrei is a tropical forest tree species in the family Burseraceae.  It occurs in China and Indo-China; in Vietnam it may be called cốc đá or chua luy; no subspecies are listed in the Catalogue of Life.

References 

Burseraceae
Trees of Vietnam